Prego is a U.S. brand of Italian pasta sauce.

Prego, an Italian interjection meaning "You're welcome", may also refer to:

Arts and entertainment
 Prego (film), a 2015 American short comedy film
 "Prego", a 1991 instrumental by Wrathchild America from 3-D
 "Prego", a 2009 song by Melinda Santiago, Sticky Fingaz & Chocolatt from the A Day in the Life film soundtrack

Food
 Prego Restaurant, known as one of the originators of California-style pizza
 Prego sandwich, a grilled beef sandwich in Portuguese cuisine
 McPrego, a McDonalds sandwich in Portugal; see International availability of McDonald's products
 Prego, a brand of soft drink similar to Rivella

Other uses
 Prego v. City of New York, a 1988 hospital safety negligence lawsuit involving HIV
 Verónica Prego, American doctor who was the plaintiff in the suit
 Prego, a line of cameras from Rollei

See also
 Preggo (disambiguation)
 Pregnancy